Komárom (later) is a city in Hungary on the south bank of the Danube in Komárom-Esztergom County. Komárno, Slovakia, is on the northern bank. Komárom was formerly a separate village called . In 1892 Komárom and Újszőny were connected with an iron bridge and in 1896 the two towns were united under the name city of Komárom. The fortress played an important role in the Hungarian Revolution of 1848 and many contemporary English sources refer to it as the Fortress of Comorn.

History 

Following the Hungarian conquest of the Carpathian Basin at the turn of the 9th and 10th centuries, Prince Árpád gave Komárom and the Komárom county vicinity to tribal chieftain Ketel. Ketel was the first known ancestor of the famous Koppán (genus) clan. At the beginning of the 12th century, this tribe founded the town's Benedictine Monastery in honor of the Blessed Virgin, mentioned in 1222 by the name of Monostorium de Koppán. The Turks destroyed much of the monastery and its surroundings in 1529, and the area was thus depopulated. Later references refer to it as the Pioneer Monastery (Pusztamonostor). Presently, it is called Koppánymonostor (Koppán's Monastery) in honor of its founding family. Roman ruins (including a stone mile marker and watchtowers) still stand today.

The town was heavily damaged in the 1763 Komárom earthquake.

Between 1850 and 1871 the Fort Monostor (Monostori Erőd) was built nearby.

In 1920 Komárom was split by the newly created border of Czechoslovakia. In 1920 Hungary was forced to sign the Treaty of Trianon recognizing the new imposed borders including the border with Czechoslovakia. The loss of its territory created a sizable Hungarian minority in Slovakia. The Slovak part is today Komárno, Slovakia. In 1938 the entire city was returned to Hungary, its Regent, Admiral Horthy receiving a tumultuous welcome from the citizens  as he crossed the old bridge and entered the formerly dismembered part. At the end of World War II the city was again divided between Hungary and Czechoslovakia.

After World War II the occupying Soviets built the country's biggest ammunition storage in the Fortress of Monostor. Thousands of wagons of ammunition were forwarded from this strictly guarded area. One of a series of forts, the Monostor is today open to the public as a museum.

Komárom and Komárno are connected by two bridges: The older iron bridge, and a newer lifting bridge. Currently a third bridge is under construction with estimated completion by 2020/2021. The vast majority of its funding coming from the European Union's Connecting Europe Facility.

The two towns used to be a border crossing between Czechoslovakia (today Slovakia) and Hungary, until both countries became part of the Schengen Area, resulting in all immigration and customs checks being lifted on December 12, 2007.

Notable people 
 Franz Heckenast (1889–1939), Austrian artillery officer and opponent of Nazism
 Jovan Monasterlija (d. 1706), Serb vice-voivode and Habsburg imperial officer 
 Julie Kopacsy-Karczag (1867–1957), operatic soprano
 Cardinal Leopold Karl von Kollonitsch (1631–1707), Catholic prelate
 Franz Lehár (1870–1948), Austro-Hungarian composer
 Theodor Körner, Austrian President
 Mór Jókai (1825-1904), writer
 Hans Selye (1907–1982), Hungarian-Austrian-Canadian endocrinologist
 Tünde Szabó (1945-2021), Hungarian actress
 Péter Szijjártó (born 1978), Hungarian Minister of Foreign Affairs and Trade
 Endre Komaromi-katz, painter

Twin towns – sister cities

Komárom is twinned with:

 Gratwein-Straßengel, Austria
 Khust, Ukraine
 Komárno, Slovakia
 Lieto, Finland
 Naumburg, Germany
 Sebeș, Romania
 Sosnowiec, Poland

See also 
 Komárno
 Komárom county
 Fort Monostor

References

External links 

  in Hungarian, English, German and Slovak
 Aerial photography: Komárom
 Komárom on wiki.utikonyvem.hu
 "The Battle at Comorn in Hungary on 11th July 1849" -  painting by Albrecht Adam, 1855

 
Populated places in Komárom-Esztergom County
Divided cities
Hungary–Slovakia border crossings
Populated places on the Danube